Galium proliferum, also known as limestone bedstraw, is a species of plant in the Rubiaceae family. It is native to Northeastern Mexico and the Southeastern United States. More specifically, it can be found in American states California (San Diego and San Bernardino County), southern Nevada (Clark County), southern Utah (Kane and Washington County), Arizona, New Mexico, Texas, as well as the Mexican states Coahuila and Nuevo León.

Phylogeny
It is the sister group to Galium virgatum. It is also closely related to Galium texense and Galium circaezans, as can be seen in the following cladogram:

References

External links
Photo of herbarium specimen at Missouri Botanical Garden, collected 1851 near El Paso, isotype of Galium virgatum var. diffusum and of Galium proliferum
Photo of herbarium specimen at Missouri Botanical Garden, collected 1884 in Pima Country, Arizona, isotype of Galium proliferum var. subnudum

proliferum
Flora of California
Flora of Nuevo León
Flora of Coahuila
Flora of Texas
Flora of New Mexico
Flora of Arizona
Flora of Nevada
Flora of Utah
Flora of Mexico
Flora of the United States
Flora without expected TNC conservation status